The 1916–17 Missouri Tigers men's basketball team represented the University of Missouri during the 1916–17 college basketball season. The team was led by first year head coach John Miller.  The captain of the team was Fred Williams.

Missouri finished with a 12–4 record overall and a 10–4 record in the Missouri Valley Intercollegiate Athletic Association.  This was good enough for a 2nd-place finish in the regular season conference standings.

Schedule and results

References

Missouri Tigers men's basketball seasons
Missouri
Tiger
Tiger